Hostal Palanques is a hostal located at Avinguda Sant Antoni, 16 in La Massana Parish, Andorra. It is a heritage property registered in the Cultural Heritage of Andorra. It was built in 1933–35.

References

La Massana
Hotels in Andorra
Cultural Heritage of Andorra
Buildings and structures completed in 1935